"Jump Rope" is the ninth track on alternative rock band, Blue October's fifth studio album, "Approaching Normal", released on March 24, 2009. On November 20, 2009, the song was released as a single. A live acoustic version of the song was included on the band's album Ugly Side: An Acoustic Evening With Blue October as a bonus track.

Chart positions

References

2009 singles
Blue October songs
Universal Music Group singles
Song recordings produced by Steve Lillywhite
2008 songs
Songs written by Justin Furstenfeld